The Hargeisa Group Hospital was established in 1953. It is a 400-bed hospital, located in Hargeisa, is the largest public hospital in Somaliland, and offers healthcare facilities to patients of the city. It was founded and monetarily funded for its first few years by the renowned Somali Dr. Mohamed Aden Shk, the first ever Somali surgeon.

History
The hospital was founded in 1953.

Departments
 Maternity
 Emergency
 Dental

See also
 Ministry of Health (Somaliland)
Gargaar Multispeciality Hospital
Hargeisa Canadian Medical Center

References

External links

Hospitals in Somaliland